Amie Doherty is an Irish composer and orchestrator for film and television. She is the first woman to score an animated feature for DreamWorks.

Her most prominent works were for Spirit Untamed (2021), Undone (2019), Here and Now (2018), Love You to Death (2019), The High Note (2020), Battle at Big Rock (2019), and Happiest Season (2020).

In addition to her composing work, she has orchestrated and conducted scores for numerous TV series including Star Trek: Discovery, Star Trek: Picard, Fargo, The Umbrella Academy, and Altered Carbon; and for musicians including Lady Gaga and 50 Cent.

Career
Before moving to Los Angeles full-time in 2013, Amie lived, worked and studied in London, South Korea, Vietnam, India, and Spain. She graduated magna cum laude from Berklee College of Music's Masters program in Scoring for Film, Television, and Video Games, where she was awarded the Howard Shore Scholarship. She holds a Bachelor's Degree in Music from Trinity College, Dublin.

In 2016, Amie became a Sundance Composer Fellow, having been chosen from over 500 composers to attend the intensive Sundance Institute Music & Sound Design Lab at the legendary Skywalker Ranch. Following her time at the lab, she was announced as the 2016 Sundance Institute/Time Warner Foundation Composer Fellow. In 2013, she received the ASCAP Foundation Harold Arlen Award after being chosen as one of 12 composers worldwide to participate in the ASCAP Television & Film Scoring Workshop. 

Her score for Spirit Untamed was nominated for the 2021 International Film Music Critics Association Award for Best Original Score for an Animated Film. The score has received praise from The Film Music Institute: "Soaring voices, boisterous old west orchestrations, ethnic energy, whipping dastardly villains and tips to the Morricone hat make for a mighty impressive first time in the saddle for a female composer at DreamWorks."

Doherty won Best Score for an Animated Short for Marooned at the 2019 Hollywood Music in Media Awards (HMMA).

In 2022 she was nominated for IFMCA (International Music Film Critics Awards) Breakthrough Composer of the Year.

Works

Films

Television

References

External links

1966 births
Irish film score composers
Living people
Women film score composers